Bolpur Shantiniketan railway station is a major railway station in Birbhum district, West Bengal. Its code is BHP. It serves Bolpur City and Shantiniketan. The station consists of three platforms.

Trains 

Some of the major trains that passes from the Bolpur railway station are as follows:

 Howrah–New Jalpaiguri Vande Bharat Express
 New Jalpaiguri–Howrah Shatabdi Express
 Sealdah - Haldibari Superfast Darjeeling Mail
 Sealdah - New Alipurduar Padatik Superfast Express
 Howrah - Guwahati Saraighat Super-fast Express
 Sealdah - Alipurduar Kanchan Kanya Express
 Sealdah–Silchar Kanchanjunga Express
 Sealdah–Agartala Kanchanjunga Express
Silchar-Coimbatore Superfast Express
 Tiruvananthapuram-Silchar Aronai Superfast Express
 Lokmanya Tilak Terminus - Kamakhya Karmabhoomi Express
 Guwahati - Sir M. Visvesvaraya Terminal Kaziranga Superfast Express
 Sir M. Visvesvaraya Terminal - New Tinsukia Superfast Express
 Guwahati–Secunderabad Express
 Kolkata–Silghat Town Kaziranga Express
 Howrah–Rampurhat Express
 Howrah–Bhagalpur Kavi Guru Express
 Sealdah–Rampurhat Intercity Express
 Howrah–Gaya Express
 Sealdah-Malda Town Gour Express
 Kolkata-Balurghat Tebhaga Express
 Barddhaman–Rampurhat Express
 Sealdah–Varanasi Express
 Howrah–Jamalpur Express
 Kolkata–Jogbani Express
 Sealdah-Rampurhat Maa Taara Express
 Sealdah-Bamanhat Uttar Banga Express
 Kolkata–Haldibari Intercity Express
 Howrah - Azimganj Ganadevata Express
 Howrah-Radhikapur Kulik Express
 Howrah-Bolpur Shantiniketan Express
 Yesvantpur-Muzzafarpur Express
 Howrah–Jamalpur Express
 Howrah–Malda Town Intercity Express
 Howrah–Gaya Express

Facilities

The station have all important facilities like reservation counter (8 am to 8 pm), two and four wheeler parking, resting room, railway canteen (Jan Aahar). Station have escalators for going through the platforms.

References

External links

Railway stations in Birbhum district
Howrah railway division